Zvonko Canjuga (born 1921) is a Croatian former footballer.

Club career
Born in Bjelovar, he started playing in the youth teams of Građanski, and later as senior he played for HŠK Građanski Zagreb, NK Lokomotiva, FK Partizan and HNK Rijeka.  He was a forward who left an important mark with Rijeka, scoring 43 goals during five seasons with the club. He was a key forward for the club in tandem with Stojan Osojnak. In 1952, he was Rijeka's top scorer.

References

1921 births
Possibly living people
Sportspeople from Bjelovar
Association football forwards
Yugoslav footballers
Croatian footballers
HŠK Građanski Zagreb players
FK Partizan players
HNK Rijeka players
Yugoslav First League players